Tomoxia alboscutella is a species of beetle in the genus Tomoxia of the family Mordellidae. It was described by Ermisch in 1955.

References

Beetles described in 1955
Tomoxia